Petalite, also known as castorite, is a lithium aluminum phyllosilicate mineral LiAlSi4O10, crystallizing in the monoclinic system. Petalite occurs as colorless, pink, grey, yellow, yellow grey, to white tabular crystals and columnar masses. It occurs in lithium-bearing pegmatites with spodumene, lepidolite, and tourmaline. Petalite is an important ore of lithium, and is converted to spodumene and quartz by heating to ~500 °C and under 3 kbar of pressure in the presence of a dense hydrous alkali borosilicate fluid with a minor carbonate component. Petalite (and secondary spodumen formed from it) is lower in iron than primary spodumene, making it a more useful source of lithium in, e.g., the production of glass. The colorless varieties are often used as gemstones.

Discovery and occurrence

Petalite was discovered in 1800, by Brazilian naturalist and statesman Jose Bonifacio de Andrada e Silva.  Type locality: Utö Island, Haninge, Stockholm, Sweden. The name is derived from the Greek word petalon, which means leaf, alluding to its perfect cleavage.

Economic deposits of petalite are found near Kalgoorlie, Western Australia; Aracuai, Minas Gerais, Brazil; Karibib, Namibia; Manitoba, Canada; and Bikita, Zimbabwe.

The first important economic application for petalite was as a raw material for the glass-ceramic cooking ware CorningWare. It has been used as a raw material for ceramic glazes.

References

External links

Lithium minerals
Phyllosilicates
Monoclinic minerals
Minerals in space group 13
Gemstones